Playmates or Playmate may refer to:

 Playboy Playmate, a female model featured in the centerfold/gatefold of Playboy

Film and television
 Playmates (1915 film), directed by Mauritz Stiller
 Playmates (1918 film), starring Oliver Hardy
 Playmates (Around the Town), a 1922 British short film
 Playmates (1921 film), starring Diana Serra Cary
 Playmates (1941 film), starring Kay Kyser
 Playmates (1972 film), written by Richard Baer

Music
 "Playmates" (song), ostensibly written by Saxie Dowell in 1940
 The Playmates, a 50's music group
 Playmates (album), an album by Small Faces in 1977

Novels
 Playmates, a 1987 novel by Andrew Neiderman
 Playmates (novel), published in 1989 by Robert B. Parker

Organizations
 Playmates Toys, a toy manufacturer, subsidiary of Playmates Holdings Ltd
 Playmates (game company), a producer of video games and the publisher of Exosquad

See also
 List of Playboy Playmates of the Month
 Playboy (disambiguation)
 Playgirl (disambiguation)